Manta  is a town and arrondissement in the Atakora Department of northwestern Benin. It is an administrative division under the jurisdiction of the commune of Boukoumbè. According to the population census conducted by the Institut National de la Statistique Benin on  2013, the arrondissement had a total population of 13,633.

Village 
Dikon Hein 
Dikouténi
Dimatadoni
Dimatima
Dipokor
Dipokor-Tchaaba
Kouhingou
Koukouakoumagou
Koukouangou
Koumadogou
Kounatchatiégou
Koutangou-Manta
Koutchantié
Takotiéta
Tatchadiéta

Education 
Manta has a college.

References

Populated places in the Atakora Department
Arrondissements of Benin